Asiophlugis is a genus of Asian bush crickets belonging to the tribe Phlugidini, of the subfamily Meconematinae.

The known distribution of Asiophlugis is Malesia (including Sulawesi and the Philippines) and Indo-China (but there are no Vietnam records).

Species
The Orthoptera Species File lists:
 Asiophlugis bintulu Gorochov, 2019
 Asiophlugis borneoensis (Jin, 1993)
 Asiophlugis cercalis Gorochov, 2012
 Asiophlugis dubia (Karny, 1907)
 Asiophlugis kubah Gorochov, 2012
 Asiophlugis legitima Gorochov, 2019
 Asiophlugis lobata Gorochov, 2019
 Asiophlugis longiuncus Gorochov, 2013
 Asiophlugis malacca Gorochov, 1998
 Asiophlugis paracercalis Gorochov, 2019
 Asiophlugis philippina (Jin, 1993)
 Asiophlugis rete Gorochov, 1998 - type species (locality: Taman Negara National Park, Pahang)
 Asiophlugis sulawesi (Jin, 1993)
 Asiophlugis temasek Gorochov & Tan, 2011
 Asiophlugis thaumasia (Hebard, 1922)
 Asiophlugis trusmadi Gorochov, 2011

References

External links 

Tettigoniidae genera
Meconematinae
Orthoptera of Asia